Equatorial Guinean Ambassador to China

The Equatorial Guinean ambassador in Beijing is the official representative of the Government in Malabo to the Government of the People's Republic of China.

List of representatives

References 

Ambassadors of Equatorial Guinea to China
China
Equatorial Guinea